"Alone" is a single by American DJ and record producer Marshmello. It was first released in May 2016, then later released as a digital download on June 17, 2016 on iTunes and for streaming on Spotify. Upon its release, it charted on the Canadian Hot 100 at 56 and US Billboard Hot 100 at 60, and its music video has received over 2.3 billion views as of September 2022 on YouTube. In February 2019, it reached a new peak of 28 on the Billboard Hot 100 following Marshmello playing a virtual live concert in the video game Fortnite. It is also the first and only Monstercat song to be certified Platinum (or higher) by the RIAA.

Music video
The release of the music video for "Alone" was released on July 2, 2016 on both Marshmello's and Monstercat's YouTube channels. It is the 11th most liked YouTube video.

The video shows Marshmello being bullied by his fellow schoolmates. A sympathetic classmate goes to his house after school, but sees him creating music. The music video was filmed at "The Pegasus School" in California. She decides to record and share a video of her findings and Marshmello becomes more popular overnight. The video ends with Marshmello taking out his portable EDM Pad Controller, a Native Instruments Traktor Kontrol S4 MK2, and stirring up a dance party in his classroom.

During the video, Marshmello is shown placing a rat in a cage with the label "Joel" on the front. This is reference to Canadian electronic music producer and DJ Joel "deadmau5" Zimmerman. The reason behind this joke was a series of tweets posted by the Canadian DJ blasting Marshmello for his "poor music" and calling his followers "brain-dead sheep". Marshmello responded jokingly asking if deadmau5 wanted to have a basketball match and the loser would buy dinner, after which, the Canadian DJ deleted all of his tweets that disputed Marshmello.

A Fortnite music video was released on October 14, 2019 on Marshmello's YouTube channel.

Track listing

Charts

Weekly charts

Year-end charts

Certifications

Release history

References

2016 songs
2016 singles
Trap music (EDM) songs
Future bass songs
Marshmello songs
Monstercat singles
Songs written by Marshmello